Fernando Ortiz Fernández (16 July 1881 – 10 April 1969) was a Cuban essayist, anthropologist, ethnomusicologist and scholar of Afro-Cuban culture. Ortiz was a prolific polymath dedicated to exploring, recording, and understanding all aspects of indigenous Cuban culture. Ortiz coined the term "transculturation," the notion of converging cultures.

Life
Ortiz was born in Havana.

Disillusioned with politics in the early period of Cuban history and having been a member of President Gerardo Machado's Liberal Party, and a Liberal member of its House of Representatives from 1917 to 1922, he became active in the early nationalist civic revival movement.

Throughout his life Ortiz was involved in the foundation of institutions and journals dedicated to the study of Cuban culture. He was the cofounder of the Cuban Academy of the Language in 1926. He also founded Surco (founded 1930) and Ultra (1936–47), both journals that provided commentary on foreign journals. In 1937 he founded the Sociedad de Estudios Afrocubanos (Society of Afro-Cuban Studies) and the journal Estudios Afrocubanos (Afro-Cuban Studies).

He helped found the journals Revista Bimestre Cubana, Archivos del Folklore Cubano, and Estudios Afrocubanos.

Ortiz also developed a theory of activism within Cuba's political system. He said that Afro-Cubans had been characterized negatively based on their African descent, and traits said to be "primitive." He wanted to show the true nature of their culture: its language, music and other arts.

His books, La Africania de la Musica Folklorica de Cuba (1950), and Los Instrumentos de la Musica Afrocubana (1952 - 1955) are still regarded as key references in the study of Afro-Cuban music.

Fernando Ortiz died in Havana in 1969 and was interred there in the Colon Cemetery.

Legacy and honors
After Ortiz's death the government established the Fernando Ortiz Foundation, which devotes itself to studies of ethnology, sociology and Cuba's popular traditions. Since 1995 it has been led by one of his prominent students, Miguel Barnet, known for his development of the testimonial style in ethnographic studies. In current times the foundation continues the work started by Ortiz. It initiates serious scholarly discussions around many cultural issues, including the survival of elements of racism and racial prejudice, and development of measures to deal with such problems.

Bibliography
 Los negros brujos (1906) 
 Los negros esclavos (1916)
 Un catauro de cubanismos: Apuntes lexicográficos (1923)
 Glosario de afronegrismos (1924)
 Contrapunteo cubano del tabaco y el azúcar (1940; trans. Cuban Counterpoint: Tobacco and Sugar, 1995)
 El engaño de la raza, (The deceit of races), (1942)
 La Africania de la musica folklorica de Cuba (1950); “The Africanness of Folkloric Cuban Music”) 
 Los bailes y el teatro de los negros en el folklore de Cuba (1951; “The Dances and Theatre of Blacks in Cuban Folklore”).
 Los instrumentos de la musica afrocubana (1952-1955)
 Historia de una pelea cubana contra los demonios (1959); “History of A Cuban Struggle Against the Demons” (1959)
 Nuevo catauro de cubanismos (1985) (posthumous)
 Los negros curros (1986) (posthumous)

References

Further reading
Pérez Firmat, Gustavo. The Cuban Condition: Translation and Identity in Modern Cuban Literature''. Cambridge: Cambridge University Press, 1989. Rpt. 1997, 2006.

External links
Fernando Ortiz. Polymath Virtual Library, Fundación Ignacio Larramendi

1881 births
1969 deaths
People from Havana
Ethnomusicologists
Cuban essayists
Cuban anthropologists
Cuban male writers
Male essayists
20th-century musicologists
20th-century essayists
20th-century anthropologists